What I Live to Do is the debut studio album by American country music artist James Bonamy. Released in February 1996, it includes the single "I Don't Think I Will", a number 2 hit on the U.S. Billboard Hot Country Singles & Tracks charts, and "She's Got a Mind of Her Own" and "All I Do Is Love Her". The first single, "Dog on a Toolbox", was withdrawn by the label and replaced with "She's Got a Mind of Her Own".

Critical reception
Dan Kuchar of Country Standard Time gave a mixed review. He thought that Bonamy's singing voice had "power and flair", but criticized the songwriting of most songs other than "I Don't Think I Will" and "The Devil Goes Fishin'".

Track listing

Personnel
James Bonamy – lead vocals
Joe Chemay – bass guitar
Dan Dugmore – pedal steel guitar
Larry Franklin – fiddle, mandolin
Paul Franklin – pedal steel guitar
Steve Gibson – acoustic guitar, electric guitar, mandolin
John Hobbs – piano, electric piano, Hammond organ
Dann Huff – electric guitar
Carl Jackson – background vocals
Michael Jones – background vocals
Dan Kelly – fiddle
Paul Leim – drums
Brent Mason – electric guitar
Terry McMillan – harmonica, percussion
Blue Miller – background vocals
Billy Joe Walker, Jr. – acoustic guitar
John Willis – acoustic guitar

Charts

Weekly charts

Year-end charts

References

External links
[ What I Live to Do] at Allmusic

1996 debut albums
James Bonamy albums
Epic Records albums
Albums produced by Doug Johnson (record producer)